Thomas A. "Tom" Loftus (born April 24, 1945) is a retired American diplomat and politician from Wisconsin. A member of the Democratic Party, he was United States Ambassador to Norway from 1993 through 1998, during the presidency of Bill Clinton.  

Prior to his diplomatic service, he was the 70th Speaker of the Wisconsin State Assembly (1983–1991) at the culmination of a 14-year career in the Wisconsin Legislature, and was the Democratic nominee for Governor of Wisconsin in the 1990 election.

Biography 
Loftus was born in Stoughton, Wisconsin.  He received his bachelor's degree from the University of Wisconsin–Whitewater and his master's degree from the University of Wisconsin–Madison. Elected to the Wisconsin State Assembly in 1976, Loftus served as a state representative until 1991. In 1982, Loftus was elected speaker of the Assembly, a position he held until he left the Assembly in 1991. In the 1990 Wisconsin gubernatorial election, Loftus was the unsuccessful Democratic nominee against incumbent Republican governor Tommy Thompson.  On November 4, 1993, President Bill Clinton appointed Loftus United States Ambassador to Norway and he served until December 22, 1997. Governor Jim Doyle appointed Loftus to the University of Wisconsin System Board of Regents in 2005.

Notes

People from Stoughton, Wisconsin
University of Wisconsin–Whitewater alumni
University of Wisconsin–Madison alumni
Members of the Wisconsin State Assembly
Speakers of the Wisconsin State Assembly
Ambassadors of the United States to Norway
1945 births
Living people